Milia-like calcinosis is a cutaneous condition characterized by small, milia-like lesions that develop on the dorsal surface of the hands and the face.

See also 
 Milia en plaque
 List of cutaneous conditions

References 

Skin conditions resulting from errors in metabolism